The second season of the Romanian reality talent show Vocea României premiered on ProTV on September 25, 2012. It was hosted by Pavel Bartoș and Nicoleta Luciu, while Vlad Roșca was the social media correspondent. All four coaches returned for their second season.

The season expanded from the first season: each coach had fourteen artists on their team, rather than twelve as in the first season, resulting in 24 contestants qualifying for the live shows, as opposed to 20 the previous year. The blind auditions have also been extended from five to six episodes. The pre-selection phase was extended to more locations across Romania; they were held June 4 to June 29, 2012, in Bucharest, Iași, Constanța, Timișoara and Cluj-Napoca.

The season finale aired on December 26, 2012. Julie Mayaya, mentored by coach Horia Brenciu, was declared winner of the season. It was Brenciu's first victory as a coach.

Pre-selections 

Pre-selections took place in the following cities:

Teams 
Color key

Blind auditions 
The first phase of the competition, the blind auditions, taped August 6–9, 2012 at the MediaPro Studios, Buftea, began airing when the season premiered on September 25, 2012.
Color key

Episode 1 (September 25) 
The first of six pre-recorded audition episodes aired on Tuesday, September 25, 2012. The show started with the four coaches and the season 1 finalists singing "Moves like Jagger".

Episode 2 (October 2) 
The second episode aired on October 2, 2012.

Episode 3 (October 9) 
The third episode aired on October 9, 2012.

Episode 4 (October 19) 
The fourth episode aired on October 19, 2012.

Episode 5 (October 23) 
The fifth episode was aired on October 23, 2012.

Episode 6 (October 30) 
The sixth and last blind audition episode aired on October 30, 2012.

* Host Pavel Bartoș auditioned as a joke. The coaches immediately recognized him and turned around, though, obviously, Bartoș did not join either of their teams.

The battles 
After the blind auditions, each coach had fourteen contestants for the battle rounds, taped October 15–17, 2012 at the MediaPro Studios, Buftea, and aired November 6–20, 2012. Coaches began narrowing down the playing field by training the contestants with the help of "trusted advisors". Each episode featured nine or ten battles consisting of pairings from within each team, and each battle concluding with the respective coach eliminating one of the two contestants.

The trusted advisors for these episodes are: Monica Anghel working with Horia Brenciu; Cristi Minculescu working with Loredana Groza; Șerban Cazan working with Smiley and Randi working with Marius Moga
Color key

Episode 7 (6 November)
The seventh episode aired on November 6, 2012.

Episode 8 (13 November)
The eighth episode aired on November 13, 2012.

Episode 9 (20 November)
The ninth episode aired on November 20, 2012.

The sing-off 
At the end of the battle rounds, each coach advanced five contestants from their team to the live shows, leaving the other two to duel for the sixth and last spot, in an extra round called "the sing-off" (cântecul decisiv). The contestants sang their blind audition songs again and the coaches chose one contestant each.

Color key:

Live shows 
Color key

Live Playoffs (Week 1)
Three contestants from each team competed in each of the first two live shows, which aired on Tuesday, November 27 and Saturday, December 1, 2012, respectively. In either of the two shows, the public vote could save one contestant from each team, the second one being chosen by the coach. The third-placed contestant was eliminated. The sing-off concept remained a battles-only feature after the first season and disappeared from the live shows.

Quarterfinals (Week 2 & Week 3 - Part 1) 
Team Brenciu and Team Smiley competed in the third live show, which aired on Tuesday, December 4. Team Loredana and Team Moga competed in the fourth live show, which aired on Tuesday, December 11. In each team, the winner of the public televote advanced to the next stage, while the 4th-placed contestant was eliminated. The coach got to save one of the remaining two contestants.

Semi-final (Week 3 - Part 2)
All eight remaining contestants performed two songs each in the semi-final on Friday, December 14, 2012: a duet with one of their coach's season 1 contestants and a solo song. Within each team, the coach and the viewers each had a 50/50 say; the contestant with the highest combined score went on to the final.

Final (Week 4)
The top 4 contestants performed in the grand final on Wednesday, December 26, 2012. This week, the four finalists performed a solo song, a duet with their coach and a duet with a celebrity. The public vote determined the winner, and that resulted in a victory for Julie Mayaya, Horia Brenciu's first victory as a coach.

* Imre Vízi and Pacha Man were supposed to sing "Același sânge", but the latter was unable to make it to the MediaPro Studios on time due to being stranded on an international airport on a very snowy day. As a result, Vízi and a few other contestants had an improvised performance instead.

Elimination chart 
Color key
Artist info

Result details

Overall

Controversies 
Andreea Olariu, a contestant eliminated in episode 12, and her mother, Lucia, accused ProTV of unfairly trying to eliminate her and ruin her public image. The two claimed that Smiley, Andreea's coach in the contest, deliberately picked songs that would put her in a bad light. Lucia Olariu also claimed that Andreea had not been given enough time to rehearse and that Julie Mayaya's victory had been staged.

Ratings

External links 
 Official Vocea României website

References 

2012 Romanian television seasons